Eleanor Catherine Parker is a British historian and medievalist.

Career 
Parker studied Old and Middle English and Old Norse Literature at the University of Oxford.  she is lecturer in Medieval English Literature at Brasenose College, Oxford, and was previously a Mellon Postdoctoral Fellows at The Oxford Research Centre in the Humanities (TORCH). She is a columnist at History Today. In May 2018, she published her first book, Dragon Lords: The History and Legends of Viking England. Her second book, Conquered: The Last Children of Anglo-Saxon England, was published in 2022, and was selected by The Times as one of the best books of 2022. Her third book, Winters in the World: A Journey through the Anglo-Saxon Year, was described by Kathryn Hughes as a "magical exploration of the weather literature left behind by the poets, scientists and historians of Anglo-Saxon Britain",, by Christopher Howse as "fascinating and authoritative", and by Charlie Connelly as a "beautifully written account [which] transports us through each season in a deeply sensual manner". It was selected by Dominic Sandbrook writing in The Times as one of the 25 best history books of 2022 and by Michael Wood as one of the 21 best books for history lovers in BBC History Magazine.

Parker started her blog, "A Clerk of Oxford", in 2008, whilst an undergraduate student at Oxford. The blog won the 2015 Longman-History Today award for Digital History. It was described as "unrivalled in bringing in outsiders to understand the reality of everything from the Dwarves' treasure to God's Darling" and "an orchard of golden apples" by Christopher Howse in The Daily Telegraph. In 2019, Parker read from the Knútsdrápur, and interpreted its meaning, in a programme for BBC World Service.

References

External links 
 Eleanor Parker at History Today
 Eleanor Parker on Twitter

Living people
British medievalists
Alumni of the University of Oxford
Place of birth missing (living people)
British historians
British bloggers
Year of birth missing (living people)